Clairavaux is a commune in the Creuse department in the Nouvelle-Aquitaine region in central France.

Geography

Population

Sights
The French Ministry of Culture lists several historic monuments in Clairavaux:
 The twelfth-century church, Église Saint-Roch et de l'Assomption de Notre-Dame 
 The remains of a feudal castle, the Château fort de Puyravaux, at Branges
 A 13th-century chapel, previously the parish church Église Paroissiale Sainte-Anne et Saint-Louis, at Boucheresse
 A 12th-century stone cross

A memorial commemorates two members of the French Resistance, killed by the Wehrmacht on 14 July 1944 at Clairavaux.

See also
Communes of the Creuse department

References

External links

Communes of Creuse